32 Counties may refer to:
The traditional 32 counties of Ireland - politically, the term is mostly used by groups seeking a Unification of Ireland
"32 Counties" (song), by Dustin the Turkey
32 County Sovereignty Movement